Guanzate is a comune (municipality) in the Province of Como in the Italian region Lombardy, located about  northwest of Milan and about  southwest of Como. As of 31 December 2004, it had a population of 5,290 and an area of 6.9 km².

Guanzate borders the following municipalities: Appiano Gentile, Bulgarograsso, Cadorago, Cassina Rizzardi, Cirimido, Fenegrò, Fino Mornasco, Lomazzo, Veniano.

Demographic evolution

References

External links
 www.comune.guanzate.co.it

Cities and towns in Lombardy